Bartlett Bench is a bare, flat benchlike elevation which overlooks Bartlett Glacier from the east, located  south-southwest of Mount Ruth in the Queen Maud Mountains. It was mapped by the U.S. Geological Survey from surveys and from U.S. Navy air photos, 1960–64, and named by the New Zealand Geological Survey Antarctic Expedition Scott Glacier Party, 1969–70, in association with Bartlett Glacier.

References 

Mesas of Antarctica
Landforms of the Ross Dependency
Amundsen Coast